The Tiburon Handicap is an American Thoroughbred ungraded stakes race for three-year-old fillies run early each year at Golden Gate Fields.  Set at a distance of six furlongs, the sprint now offers a purse of $75,000.

The Tiburon is named for the once fishing village across the San Francisco Bay from the track.  The word "tiburon" is Spanish for "shark."

Past winners

 2009 - Ultra Blend (Roberto Gonzalez)
 2008 - Heaven on Hold (Russell Baze)
 2007 - Glorification (Jason Lumpkins)
 2006 - Press Camp

 1992 - Gum (Patrick Valenzuela) (Gum holds the record at Golden Gate Fields for this distance: 1:41 1/5, which in Gum's time, was one and one/sixteenth mile on the turf run over the Lakeside Turf Course.)

External links
 Golden Gate Fields website

Horse races in California
Golden Gate Fields
Ungraded stakes races in the United States
Flat horse races for three-year-old fillies